Mardis is a surname. Notable people with the surname include:

Elaine Mardis (born 1962), American geneticist
Samuel Wright Mardis (1800–1836), American politician

See also
Shooting of Jeremy Mardis